Return of the Living Dad is an original novel written by Kate Orman and based on the long-running British science fiction television series Doctor Who. It features the Seventh Doctor, Chris and Roz, Bernice and Jason.

Plot
Bernice Summerfield's father disappeared when she was seven years old, but during her honeymoon, a clue leads her to discover him 500 years in his past, in England in 1983.

Notes
This novel's working title was Big Trouble in Little Chalfont.

Paul Cornell had input into part of the story of Return of the Living Dad, while Orman had input in Cornell's Human Nature.

Reception
Readers of Doctor Who Magazine gave the novel a rating of 73.29% (from 805 votes).

References

1996 British novels
1996 science fiction novels
Virgin New Adventures
British science fiction novels
Novels by Kate Orman
Seventh Doctor novels
Fiction set in 1983
Fiction set in 1996
Fiction set in the 26th century